Janaesia antarctica is a moth of the family Noctuidae. It is found in Punta Arenas in Chile and Tierra del Fuego in Argentina.

The wingspan is 28–38 mm. Adults are on wing from December to February.

External links
 Noctuinae of Chile

Noctuinae